Frederick Joseph Ulbrick (8 August 1894 – 6 January 1964) was an Australian rules footballer who played with Footscray in the Victorian Football League (VFL).

Notes

External links 
		

1894 births
1964 deaths
Australian rules footballers from Tasmania
Western Bulldogs players
Lefroy Football Club players